Natalia Chatzigiannidou (born ) is a Greek footballer who plays for Rethymniaki Enosi Athliton and the Greece women's national football team, where she is also the captain.

Club career 

Chatzigiannidou was born on 19 July 1979 in Florina, Greece, and started her career at the age of 12 with the local club Filiriakos Florinas in 1991, which was also the year the club was founded, where she won an A Division league (women's top-tier league) title in 2000, and played for the club until 2007.

Chatzigiannidou's tenure in Filiriakos coincided with the club's golden years; Regional Championship in 1992–93 season and promotion; in addition to the 2000 A Division title, they were also runners-up in 1998, 2001, 2002 and 2004, and third in 1999; the successes include presences in European tournaments such as Women's Cup of Italy (version of Sicily in 2003), which was organized jointly by UEFA and the Italian Football Federation (FIGC), where the club was honoured by the latter, and the International Tournament of Pecquencourt among others, and a 3–0 victorious friendly match against Women's national team for 2005 Prespes Festival on 27 August 2005, where Chatzigiannidou scored the third goal, an era the club provided the national teams with 24 footballers during their 15 years of existence, until 2006, of being herself an international footballer, and also serving the club from the position of the captain.

In 2007, Chatzigiannidou moved to PAOK, where she played over 200 matches, including 30 appearances for UEFA Women's Champions League, and winning 12 A Division leagues and 5 Women's Cups until 2020, when she decided to leave the club due to disgruntlement for the way the club was treating her at the time and was released by the club after an appeal to the Hellenic Football Federation.

In April 2021, Chatzigiannidou joined Agrotikos Asteras Women.

On 27 January 2022, Chatzigiannidou joined Asteras Ladies Rethymno, having been incorporated with a delay due to professional reasons, after having agreed with the club since October 2021, a transfer which has been described as the club's most important transfer ever in its history.

For the season 2022–23, Chatzigiannidou joined Rethymniaki Enosi Athliton (REA), the successor club of Asteras Ladies Rethymno.

International career

Greece 

On 2 November 1997, Chatzigiannidou made her debut for Greece women's national football team in a match against Yugoslavia, where she also scored.

Chatzigiannidou was also part of the squad that competed at 2004 Summmer Olympics.

On 26 January 2016, Chatzigiannidou made her 139th top level international appearance and tied Giorgos Karagounis, in a match against Albania for the UEFA Women's Euro 2017 qualifiers, a feat combined with remarkable stability in the national team, having played in 139 matches out of 146 available since her debut.

On 8 March 2016, after making her 140th appearance in a match against Ukraine for the UEFA Women's Euro 2017 qualifiers, Chatzigiannidou surpassed Giorgos Karagounis' previous record, becoming the most capped Greek footballer in the history of the Greece national teams (including both men's and women's), and after the match was awarded a commemorative cap jointly by the Hellenic Football Federation and UEFA for the feat.

Chatzigiannidou would then go on extending her record, reaching 145 appearances until January 2017, for a tally she was awarded by Macedonia Football Clubs Association (EPSM), until 13 June 2017 had reached the remarkable number of 150 appearances, and, having made over 160 international appearances, she currently (27 January 2022) remains the most capped player in the history of the Greece national team, which she also captains.

Greece military 

Chatzigiannidou additionally played for the Greece women's national military football team at least once in 2019, in a qualifier match for the 2019 CISM Military World Games, and she has also been at least in a respective selection again in 2022 for an unofficial charity friendly match against Ladies FC Ialysos club, which was also a celebration match for the club's promotion to the A Division, for a match she was called up alongside the club teammate Argiro Karamousadaki, who was also called up, with the club congratulating both of them for the honour in an announcement.

Honours 

Filiriakos Florinas
 A Division: 2000; runners-up: 1998, 2001, 2002, 2004; third place: 1999
 Regional Championship: 1992–93

PAOK
 A Division: 2008, 2009, 2010, 2011, 2012, 2013, 2015, 2016, 2017, 2018, 2019, 2020
 Women's Cup: 2013, 2014, 2015, 2016, 2017

See also 
 List of women's footballers with 100 or more international caps
 Greece at the 2004 Summer Olympics

References

External links 
 Natalia Chatzigiannidou – Profile at the HFF (Archived) 
 Natalia Chatzigiannidou – FIFA competition record (Archived)
 
 A-Sports – Women's football 
 Profile at Sports-Reference.com

1979 births
Living people
Women's association football midfielders
Greek women's footballers
Place of birth missing (living people)
Greece women's international footballers
FIFA Century Club
Olympic footballers of Greece
Footballers at the 2004 Summer Olympics
PAOK FC (women) players
Footballers from Florina